Vernie Floyd Speer (January 27, 1913 – March 22, 1969) was an American professional baseball pitcher. He was born on January 27, 1913, in Booneville, Arkansas. He attended Booneville High School, where he starred in baseball.  His twin brother, Bernie Loyd Speer, was often his catcher.

Floyd began his professional baseball career in 1938 in the now-defunct Cotton States League. He moved to play for Shreveport in the Texas League in 1941. At the age of 30, Speer broke into the big leagues on April 25, 1943, with the Chicago White Sox. He played his last game with the Sox on May 3, 1944. He later played for other minor league teams, including the St. Paul Saints in 1943, the Milwaukee Brewers in  1945 and the Oakland Oaks in 1946-48.

Vernie Floyd Speer married Rosadell McConnell, who was also from Booneville, Arkansas.

Speer returned to Arkansas where he died in Little Rock on March 22, 1969. He was 56 years old. Speers was returned to his hometown of Booneville, where he was buried in the Carolan Community Cemetery, 5 miles outside of town.

Sources

1913 births
1969 deaths
Chicago White Sox players
Baseball players from Arkansas
Major League Baseball pitchers
Milwaukee Brewers (minor league) players
People from Booneville, Arkansas
Dallas Eagles players
Hot Springs Bathers players
Little Rock Travelers players
Monroe White Sox players
Oakland Oaks (baseball) players
Shreveport Sports players
St. Paul Saints (AA) players
Texarkana Bears players